Shahrsazi-ye Dargar (also Romanized as Shahrsāzī-ye Dargar) is a village in Sarbanan Rural District, in the Central District of Zarand County, Kerman Province, Iran. At the 2006 census, its population was 165, in 47 families.

References 

Populated places in Zarand County